Himali Sayurangi Ranaweera (born July 18 as හිමාලි සයුරංගි) [Sinhala]), is an actress in Sri Lankan cinema, theater and television. She is best known for the role as Udeni in popular television serial Deveni Inima. She started her artistic career as a presenter and later joined the film industry. She has also excelled in dance,  singing and dubbing

Personal life
She was born on 18 July as the second of the family. She has one elder brother and one younger brother. Younger brother worked in the computer department of a television channel. Her father worked at the Insurance Corporation and mother is a housewife. She completed education from Anula Vidyalaya, Nugegoda.

Sayurangi is married to Asanga Jayalath where the wedding was celebrated on 1 March 2012 at Cinnamon Lakeside hotel in Colombo. The couple has one daughter, Vanuji Senalya who was born in 2013. Asanga is the owner of an advertising agency called Adland Advertising. Sayurangi first met Asanga during a radio play where the bond later become strong during the shooting of Amaa teledrama.

Career
She entered Lama Pitiya in Sri Lanka Broadcasting Corporation at the little age and became a radio presenter. Before entering acting, she worked as a television presenter in Sri Lanka Rupavahini Corporation and hosted the programs Pehebara Ahasa, Nadun Uyana and Nuga Sevana for four years.

Her maiden acting came through the television serial Vaadiya directed by Herbert Ranjith Peiris at the age of 11. She got this opportunity with the help of fellow actress Surangi Ruwanmali.

Her first mega teledrama acting came through Adaraneeya Poornima. In 2016, she joined the mega teledrama Deveni Inima. The serial gained enormous popularity and won several awards at local television festivals. Sayurangi played as the mother "Udeni" of "Anuhas", a courageous woman abandoned by his love "Ravi" during her pregnancy.

Her maiden cinematic experience came through a minor role in 2009 film Ekamath Eka Rateka, directed by Sanath Gunathilake. However, her first screened film is 2007 blockbuster Sikuru Hathe. She won the Sarasaviya award for the best upcoming actress for her role "Samanmali" in the film. Prior to that, she won the Raigam merit award for the television serial Isuru Giri Tharanaya. For about ten years, she played the girlfriend character in many television serials.

Sayurangi is an A-grade artist in Radio, where she rendered her voice for many radio commercials and radio plays. She was first involved in the stage play Mayadevi by K. B. Herath. After that she joined the stage play Daskon which was only shown in Australia. She only acted in these two stage plays. After more than 6 years, Sayurangi made the cinema appearance in the tragic film Tsunami directed by Somaratne Dissanayake. She played the role "Sriyani", a mother who lost the child from 2004 Tsunami. In 2019, she joined the radio play Adara Wedilla produced by Sirasa FM.

She also contested in the reality show Mega Star under the team "Sooryans" led by Yureni Noshika. In 2021, he appeared in the musical megadrama Divi Thura. In the same year, she won the Best Actress award at the Borden International Film Festival in Sweden for the television serial Govi Thaththa directed by Dharshana Ruwan Dissanayake.

Selected television serials

 Adaraneeya Poornima
 Amaa 
 Deveni Inima
 Diriya Doni 
 Divithura 
 Govi Thaththa 
 Isira Bhawana
 Isuru Giri Tharanaya
 Kaviya Numba
 Lokki 
 Mama Nemei Mama 
 Maya Manthri
 Meedum Amma
 Minigan Dela 
 Oba Kawda 
 Praana
 Sansara Sakmana 
 Sapiriwara 
 Sillara Kasi
 Sonduru Sithaththi 
 Thaksalawa

Filmography

Awards

Rupavahini State Drama Festival 

|-
|| 2008 ||| Sikuru Hathe || Best Upcoming Actress ||

Sarasaviya Awards 

|-
|| 2010 ||| Sikuru Hathe || Best Upcoming Actress ||

SIGNIS Awards 

|-
|| 2011 ||| Thaksalava || Creative Supporting  Actress ||

Sumathi Awards 

|-
|| 2016 ||| Thaksalawa || Best Actress || 
|-
|| 2016 ||| Kaviya Numba || Merit Award ||

Rupavahini State Drama Festival 

|-
|| 2016 ||| Kaviya Numba || Best Actress ||

Raigam Tele'es 

|-
|| 2020 ||| Nominating three consecutive times for best actress category || Appreciation award ||

References

External links
 ජනප්‍රියත්වය රඳවා ගැනීම අපහසුයි
 දෙවෙනි ඉනිම ටෙලිය ළඟදීම අවසානයි
 අපිව අයින් කළොත් ඒවට හිත රිද්දගන්න නරකයි”- හිමාලිත් දෙවනි ඉනිම හැරයයි?
 Himali Sayurangi IMDb
 චරිත්ගේ මිණි ගං දෑල සිරසට
 Himali Sayurangi blog
 විවාහවී අවුරුදු 3යි
 Launch of Rs. 1.5 bn Luxury housing project Strong demand for Millennium Villas – Ceylinco Developers
 අපි දෙන්නම කැමති දුවෙකුට

Living people
Sri Lankan film actresses
Year of birth missing (living people)
Sinhalese actresses
20th-century Sri Lankan actresses
21st-century Sri Lankan actresses